The 1977 Walker Cup, the 26th Walker Cup Match, was played on August 26 and 27, 1977, at Shinnecock Hills Golf Club, Southampton, New York. The event was won by the United States 16 to 8.

The United States led 9–3 after the first day and 11–5 after the second-day foursomes. Needing just a point to retain the trophy, the United States won 5 of the 8 singles matches for a convincing victory. There were no halved matches, although 8 matches went to the last hole.

Format
The format for play on Friday and Saturday was the same. There were four matches of foursomes in the morning and eight singles matches in the afternoon. In all, 24 matches were played.

Each of the 24 matches was worth one point in the larger team competition. If a match was all square after the 18th hole extra holes were not played. Rather, each side earned ½ a point toward their team total. The team that accumulated at least 12½ points won the competition. If the two teams were tied, the previous winner would retain the trophy.

Teams
Ten players for the United States and Great Britain & Ireland participated in the event plus one non-playing captain for each team.

United States

Captain: Lewis Oehmig
Mike Brannan
John Fought
Gary Hallberg
Vance Heafner
Lindy Miller
Fred Ridley
Bill Sander
Dick Siderowf
Jay Sigel
Scott Simpson

Great Britain & Ireland
 & 
Captain:  Sandy Saddler
 Allan Brodie
 John Davies
 Peter Deeble
 Ian Hutcheon
 Michael Kelley
 Sandy Lyle
 Steve Martin
 Peter McEvoy
 Paul McKellar
 Gordon Murray

Friday's matches

Morning foursomes

Afternoon singles

Saturday's matches

Morning foursomes

Afternoon singles

References

Walker Cup
Golf in New York (state)
Walker Cup
Walker Cup
Walker Cup